Abrepagoge is a monotypic genus of tortrix moths belonging to tribe Archipini of the subfamily Tortricinae. It was described in 1992 by Józef Razowski.

Its sole species, Abrepagoge treitschkeana, was described (as Tortrix treitschkeana) in 1835 by Georg Friedrich Treitschke in Die Schmetterlinge von Europa 10 (3).

Abrepagoge treitschkeana is known from Eastern Europe: it has been recorded in Bulgaria, Romania, Ukraine and European Russia.

See also
List of Tortricidae genera

References

 , 2005: World Catalogue of Insects volume 5 Tortricidae
 , 1992, SHILAP revta lepid. 20: 368.

Archipini
Tortricidae genera
Monotypic moth genera
Taxa named by Georg Friedrich Treitschke
Taxa named by Józef Razowski